The 2009 Estonian Figure Skating Championships were held between 6 and 7 December 2008 in Tartu. Skaters competed in the disciplines of men's singles, ladies' singles, pair skating, and ice dancing on the senior and junior levels. The results were used to choose the teams to the 2009 World Championships and the 2009 European Championships.

Skaters from Lithuania, Latvia, and Finland competed as guests and their results were discounted from the final standings.

Senior results

Men

Ladies

Pairs

Ice dancing

Junior results

Men

Ladies

Ice dancing

External links
 
 Estonian Skating Union

Estonian Figure Skating Championships
2008 in figure skating
Estonian Figure Skating Championships, 2009
Figure Skating Championships
Figure Skating Championships